Vadim Anatolyevich Krasnoslobodtsev (born August 16, 1983) is a Kazakhstani professional ice hockey forward who currently plays for Torpedo Nizhny Novgorod of the Kontinental Hockey League (KHL).

External links

1983 births
Living people
Admiral Vladivostok players
Sportspeople from Oskemen
Kazakhstani ice hockey left wingers
Zauralie Kurgan players
Barys Nur-Sultan players
Torpedo Nizhny Novgorod players
Amur Khabarovsk players
HC Mechel players
Avangard Omsk players
HC Neftekhimik Nizhnekamsk players
Kazakhstani people of Russian descent
Asian Games gold medalists for Kazakhstan
Medalists at the 2011 Asian Winter Games
Asian Games medalists in ice hockey
Ice hockey players at the 2011 Asian Winter Games